Heqet (Egyptian , also  "Heqtit"), sometimes spelled Heket, is an Egyptian goddess of fertility, identified with Hathor, represented in the form of a frog.
 
To the Egyptians, the frog was an ancient symbol of fertility, related to the annual flooding of the Nile. 
Heqet was originally the female counterpart of Khnum, or the wife of Khnum by whom she became the mother of Her-ur.
It has been proposed that her name is the origin of the name of Hecate, the Greek goddess of witchcraft.

Name

The phonetic spelling may use the biliteral  hieroglyph (S38) in place of uniliteral  (V28). The alternative form   adds an explicit feminine ending, used alongside the "egg"  determinative (H8) to emphasize the deity's femininity.

Worship

The beginning of her cult dates to the Early Dynastic Period at least. Her name was part of the names of some high-born Second Dynasty individuals buried at Helwan, such as prince Nisuheqet, and was mentioned on a stela of Wepemnofret and in the Pyramid Texts. Early frog statuettes are often thought to be depictions of her.

Heqet was considered the wife of Khnum, who formed the bodies of new children on his potter's wheel.

In the Osiris myth, it was Heqet who breathed life into the new body of Horus at birth, as she was a goddess of the last moments of birth. As the birth of Horus became more intimately associated with the resurrection of Osiris, so Heqet's role became one more closely associated with resurrection. Eventually, this association led to her amulets gaining the phrase I am the resurrection in the Christian era along with cross and lamb symbolism.

A temple dedicated to Horus and Heqet dating to the Ptolemaic Period was found at Qus.

As a fertility goddess, associated explicitly with the last stages of the flooding of the Nile, and so with the germination of corn, she became associated with the final stages of childbirth. 
This association, which appears to have arisen during the Middle Kingdom, gained her the title She who hastens the birth (cf. the role of Heqet in the story of The Birth of the Royal Children from the Westcar Papyrus). Frog amulets representing Heqet were probably worn by women during childbirth to ensure an easy delivery.

Gallery

References

External links
 

Agricultural goddesses
Childhood goddesses
Egyptian goddesses
Fertility goddesses
Legendary amphibians
Piscine and amphibian humanoids
Hecate
Hathor